Challa Vamshi Chand Reddy is an Indian politician and a member of the Indian National Congress party. In 2014, he was elected as an MLA from Kalwakurthy constituency, situated in Mahbubnagar district of Telangana, India. Before being elected as an MLA, he was the President of Andhra Pradesh Youth Congress.

Personal life 
He was born in Seri Appareddypally, Mahaboobnagar district into a middle-class family. His father was a Government employee.

Education 
He did his schooling from Board of Intermediate Education and a Gandhi medical college dropout.

Political career 
In 2012, he was elected as the President of Andhra Pradesh Youth Congress. The election holds significance as it was for the first time when the President was not nominated but democratically elected. The election was the idea of Rahul Gandhi who wanted to promote internal democracy in the party. He was briefly suspended from Congress party for instigating a mob to attack Reliance Inc Outlets, based on a Russian website.

References

Living people
Indian National Congress politicians from Telangana
People from Mahbubnagar district
Year of birth missing (living people)